Taposh Ghosh (born 11 August 1991) is a Bangladeshi cricketer. He is a left handed batsman and slow left-arm orthodox spin bowler. He has also played Under 19 Test and One Day International matches for his country.

References

1991 births
Bangladeshi cricketers
Sylhet Division cricketers
Barisal Division cricketers
Rangpur Riders cricketers
Living people
Bangladeshi Hindus
Kala Bagan Cricket Academy cricketers
Abahani Limited cricketers
Kala Bagan Krira Chakra cricketers
Bangladesh South Zone cricketers
Khulna Division cricketers
People from Satkhira District